Ian Yentou Ho (born 25 April 1997) is a Hong Kong freestyle swimmer. He competed in the 2020 Summer Olympics.

Ho swam collegiately at Virginia Tech.

References

1997 births
Living people
People from Blacksburg, Virginia
Swimmers at the 2020 Summer Olympics
Hong Kong male freestyle swimmers
Olympic swimmers of Hong Kong
Virginia Tech Hokies men's swimmers
Competitors at the 2019 Summer Universiade
Place of birth missing (living people)